Matěj Zadražil (born February 12, 1994) is a Czech professional ice hockey centre for HC Dukla Jihlava of the Chance Liga.

Zadražil has previously played 30 games in the Czech Extraliga for HC Karlovy Vary. He joined Dukla Jihlava on May 1, 2020.

Zadražil has represented the Czech Republic at junior level, playing in the 2012 IIHF World U18 Championships.

References

External links

1994 births
Living people
HC Baník Sokolov players
Czech ice hockey centres
HC Dukla Jihlava players
KLH Vajgar Jindřichův Hradec players
HC Karlovy Vary players
People from Sokolov
Sportovní Klub Kadaň players
HC Stadion Litoměřice players
Sportspeople from the Karlovy Vary Region